ClubTelco is an Australian Telecommunications and Internet Service Provider founded in 2010, that provides telecommunications services to consumers and small businesses around Australia. Competing with the likes of Telstra, Optus, iiNet, Dodo and Internode.  ClubTelco's is owned by Vocus Group, a publicly listed company on the Australian Securities Exchange. It serves over 120,000 customers.

In the summer of 2011, the company merged with Eftel in a reverse takeover, beginning what was expected to be a significant round of consolidation in the Australian ISP industry.

Following the acquisition of Eftel by M2 Group in 2013, ClubTelco operated as a subsidiary brand of M2, until M2 itself merged with Vocus Group on 5 February 2016.

References

External links 

Internet service providers of Australia
M2 Group